John Jesse James (born 21 September 1937) is a British rower who competed in the 1964 Summer Olympics.

In 1964 he was a crew member of the British boat which won the silver medal in the coxless fours event with John Russell, Hugh Wardell-Yerburgh, and William Barry.

External links
 profile

1937 births
Living people
English male rowers
British male rowers
Olympic rowers of Great Britain
Rowers at the 1964 Summer Olympics
Olympic silver medallists for Great Britain
Olympic medalists in rowing
Medalists at the 1964 Summer Olympics